Andersen Library may refer to:

Andersen Library (University of Wisconsin Whitewater)
Elmer L. Andersen Library, University of Minnesota

See also
MD Anderson Library, University of Houston